Amritraj is a South Indian surname. It may refer to members of the tennis-playing Indian family who also represented the USA and India.

Anand Amritraj (born 1952), former Indian tennis player and businessman
Vijay Amritraj (born 1953), former Indian tennis player, sports commentator and actor
Ashok Amritraj (born 1956), American film producer and former Indian tennis player
Prakash Amritraj (born 1983), American tennis player of Indian origin; son of Vijay Amritraj
Stephen Amritraj (born 1984), American tennis player of Indian origin; son of Anand Amritraj
Alison Riske-Amritraj (born 1990), American tennis player; wife of Stephen Amritraj
Tamil-language surnames